Gulyayev or Gulyaev and Gulyayeva, Gulyaeva or Guliaeva (feminine) is a common Russian surname. It may refer to:

 Boris Gulyayev (born 1941), Soviet speed skater
 Erast Gulyaev (1846–1919), Russian naval architect
 Nikolay Gulyayev (born 1966), Soviet speed skater
 Nikolay Gulyayev (1915–2000), Russian football coach and former player
 Vadim Gulyayev (1941–1998), Russian water polo player
 Yuri Gulyayev (disambiguation), several people
 Yelena Gulyayeva (born 1967), Soviet high jumper

See also
 6783 Gulyaev, a main-belt asteroid

References

Russian-language surnames